Sebastian James Clovis (born September 1, 1979) is a Canadian television personality and former Canadian Football League player, who played free safety for the BC Lions in their Grey Cup championship 2006 season. He is currently known as an HGTV home renovation host, appearing on the television series Tackle My Reno, Save My Reno, Home to Win and Gut Job.

Childhood 

Born in London, England, Clovis migrated to Canada with his family when he was six years old. He grew up in the east end of Toronto,  in his family home where he was first introduced to carpentry and building. He is the eldest of five siblings; his brother Tristan Clovis was also a Canadian Football League player for the Saskatchewan Roughriders.
 
Clovis attended the all-boys Catholic high school, Neil McNeil High School, where he was a competitive athlete in track & field and football, which he pursued after school with the Scarborough Thunder Football Club. In his final year of high school, he attended Senator O'Connor College School where he played on the senior boys football team.

College career 

Clovis received a scholarship to Mississippi State University and later transferred to Saint Mary's University in Halifax, Nova Scotia where he played for their football team, the Huskies.

CFL career 

Clovis was drafted by the BC Lions in the 2005 CFL draft. After being sidelined with a torn ACL in the 2005 season, he came back to play all 18 games with the Lions during their 2006 Grey Cup winning season. Suffering another season-ending injury midway through the 2007 season, he was forced to rehabilitate from a second ACL tear. Returning from reconstructive knee surgery for a second time, he was traded to the Winnipeg Blue Bombers, but transferred to the Saskatchewan Roughriders midseason and remained with the Roughriders for the rest of his CFL playing career.

His nickname is "The Missile".

TV career
After retiring from football, Clovis trained as a construction contractor. He debuted as the host of Tackle My Reno in 2014, and continues to cohost the spinoff series Save My Reno. As of April, 2022, he will be launching his latest show, Gut Job, his fifth for HGTV Canada.

References

External links
 
 HGTV's Tackle My Reno

1979 births
Living people
BC Lions players
Canadian football defensive backs
Canadian football people from Toronto
Players of Canadian football from Ontario
Saint Mary's Huskies football players
Saskatchewan Roughriders players
English emigrants to Canada
Black Canadian players of Canadian football
Black Canadian broadcasters
Canadian television hosts